Barem (Brem), also known as Bunabun (Bububun, Bunubun), is a Papuan language of Sumgilbar Rural LLG, Madang Province, Papua New Guinea.

Dialects
Barem dialects are:
Qkuan Kambuar (severely endangered, with only a few speakers around the Dibor River and in Tokain village, a Waskia-speaking town)
Kimbu Kambuar (extinct)
Murukanam Barem, spoken in Murukanam village north of the Dibor river
Asumbin, spoken in Asumbin village, Bunbun ward north and inland from Gildipasi
Bunabun (spoken north of the Dibor River near the coast, including in Bunabun)

References

External links
Qkuan Kambuar recordings
Additional Qkuan Kambuar recordings

Dimir–Malas languages
Languages of Madang Province